Kraków Department (Polish: Departament krakowski) was a unit of administrative division and local government in Polish Duchy of Warsaw in years 1809–1815.

Its capital city was  Kraków and the area was further subdivided onto 10 powiats.

Kraków Department was formed following the annexation of Austrian New Galicia by the Duchy of Warsaw in 1809 including areas of Zamość and Kraków.

In 1815 it was transformed into Kraków Voivodeship, the city of Kraków itself was turned into the Free City of Kraków.

References

History of Kraków
Departments of the Duchy of Warsaw